The Frauen-Bundesliga 1991–92 was the second season of the Frauen-Bundesliga, Germany's premier football league. In this season clubs from former East Germany were allowed to compete for the first time in an all-German Bundesliga due to the integration of the East German Football Association into the German Football Association. Both divisions were thus expanded to eleven competitors to make room for one East German team each. USV Jena in the north and Wismut Aue in the south both suffered relegation after the season, though.

Northern conference

Standings

Results

Southern conference

Standings

Results

Semifinals

Final

Top scorers

Qualification

Group North

Group South 1

Group South 2

References

1991-92
Ger
1
Women